The Rush Hour is the brand name applied to a number of Australian sport and comedy themed radio shows across the Triple M network. In 2022, as part of Triple M's new drive timeslot strategy, which involved replacing Molloy with local "Rush Hour" shows in the major markets, the show returned to an expanded 2 hour (including breaks), mostly live-to-air format from 4pm to 6pm weekdays.

Melbourne
The Melbourne edition is co-hosted by former cricketer James Brayshaw and former AFL footballer Billy Brownless on Triple M Melbourne and simulcast to sister stations around Victoria as well as interstate. The show has typically aired in the late afternoon time slot on weekdays, currently (as of 2022) from 4pm to 6pm. Daily podcasts of each show are made available as well as show content being shared on social media pages and on the Triple M website.

History
The show commenced in April 2010, initially only airing Tuesday to Thursday each week, with Dave 'Higgo' Higgins anchoring the show. Numerous Triple M talent have anchored the show throughout the years, including ‘Dangerous’ Dave Williams and Digby Gillings, before Ryan ‘Rabs’ Warren took over the role in 2018.

Regular guests that visit the show from time to time have included Wayne Carey, Damien Barrett, Jason Dunstall, Danny Frawley, Brian Taylor, Chris Judd, Nathan Brown and Brigitte "Top Flight" Duclos "Todd from Barwon Heads" makes brief appearances, makes fun of Bill and hangs up before he can respond.

In 2011, the show was expanded to run from Monday to Friday, after Roy and HG's departure freed up time slot space. Over the years the length of the show and the airtime has been changed, with various time slots consisting of 3pm to 5pm, 4pm to 5pm as well as 4pm to 6pm. In 2018, the show moved to a 2pm to 4pm time slot, to accommodate the new Kennedy Molloy show, which airs from 4pm to 6pm. The 2020 and 2021 seasons saw the show shortened to 60 minutes and move to the 6pm - 7pm time slot, with the show being pre-recorded earlier in the day.

Regular segments
The show centers around several regular segments, current events discussion (especially involving sports) and celebrity interviews (usually AFL footballers, past and present.)

Topics Brownless / Brayshaw
JB or Billy comes up with a question or topic of discussion, and invites listeners to call in and give answers or tell their story, with prizes being given to the best responses. Billy is known for usually ending his topic questions with "...unusual?!" e.g. "What have you eaten, unusual?!"

Billy's Bake
A segment where Billy rants about an issue that has been annoying him of late. The rant is usually full of profanities and is presented in an exaggerated manner.

Billy's Hump Day Quiz
Most Wednesdays, Billy runs a quiz where 2 callers compete in a trivia competition (usually related to AFL) which results in a prize being given to the winner. Sometimes Billy stuffs up the way the quiz is run, causing it to go "off the rails".

The Idiot File
The self-proclaimed favourite segment of the show's listeners, this segment features a supercut of all of Billy's on-air incorrect use of grammar, mispronunciations and stuff-ups from the previous week. Usually airs towards the end of Friday shows. More recently, the clips have been integrated into a song.

Damo's Recovery Session
On Mondays during the AFL season, Damian Barrett helps to dissect the previous weekend's round of AFL.

The Midweek Rub
Towards the end of the show on Wednesdays during the AFL season, Leigh Montagna and guests, usually Damian Barrett, Ross Lyon and Dale Thomas talk about the latest AFL news and share opinions. In recent times, the Midweek Rub has been spun off into its own podcast.

Friday Brag Artist
A regular segment on Fridays, where listeners are asked to call in and explain why their chosen personal achievement should be celebrated. A snippet of "Unbelievable" by EMF gets played after each response.

Billy's Joke
Every show finishes with a joke, read out by Billy, which almost always fails to impress or is incredibly cringeworthy. Starting in 2022, the ending theme of the show is replaced with "Wooly Bully" if the joke is exceptionally poor.

References

External links
http://www.heraldsun.com.au/entertainment/woman-to-be-in-triple-m-drive-seat-with-james-brayshaw-and-billy-brownless/story-e6frf96x-1225966674158

Australian radio programs
2010s Australian radio programs
2020s Australian radio programs